The 1914 Five Nations Championship was the fifth series of the rugby union Five Nations Championship following the inclusion of France into the Home Nations Championship. Including the previous Home Nations Championships, this was the thirty-second series of the annual northern hemisphere rugby union championship. Nine matches were played between 1 January and 13 April. It was contested by England, France, Ireland, Scotland and Wales.

Table

Results

The matches

France vs. Ireland

England vs. Wales

 England: WR Johnston (Bristol Rugby), Cyril Lowe (Cambridge U), FE Chapman (Hartlepool Rovers), Ronald Poulton (Liverpool) (capt.), JHD Watson (Blackheath), FM Taylor (Leicester), GW Wood (Leicester), AG Bull (Northampton), AF Maynard (Cambridge U), John Eric Greenwood (Cambridge U), LG Brown (The London H.), J Brunton (North Durham), S Smart (Gloucester), G Ward (Leicester), Charles Pillman (Blackheath)

Wales: Bancroft (Swansea), Howell Lewis (Swansea), WH Evans (Llwynypia), W Watts (Llanelli), George Hirst (Newport), Clem Lewis (Cardiff), Bobby Lloyd (Pontypool), Jenkin Alban Davies (Llanelli) (capt.), David Watts (Maesteg), Jack Jones (Abertillery), Thomas Lloyd (Neath), Percy Jones (Pontypool), T Williams (Swansea), Edgar Morgan (Swansea), Harry Uzzell (Newport)

Wales vs. Scotland

Ireland vs. Wales

 Ireland:

Wales: Bobbie Williams (Cardiff), George Hirst (Newport), Jack Wetter (Newport), WH Evans (Llwynypia), Ivor Davies (Llanelli), (Newport), Clem Lewis (Cardiff), Bobby Lloyd (Pontypool), Jenkin Alban Davies (Llanelli) capt., David Watts (Maesteg), Jack Jones (Abertillery), Thomas Lloyd (Neath), Percy Jones (Pontypool), T Williams (Swansea), Edgar Morgan (Swansea), Harry Uzzell (Newport)

References

External links

Six Nations Championship seasons
Five Nations
Five Nations
Five Nations
Five Nations
Five Nations
Five Nations
Five Nations Championship
Five Nations Championship
Five Nations Championship
Five Nations Championship